Barregarrow is a district located between the 13th milestone and 14th milestones on the A3 Castletown to Ramsey road including the area of the Barregarrow cross-road junction and the C4 Ballaleigh Road and B10 Sartfield (Brandywell) or former Barregarrow mountain gate road in the parish of Kirk Michael in the Isle of Man.

Description
The area of Bayr Garrow or ‘Barrowgarrow’ is a former area of mountain commons or ‘rough’ pasture situated on a series of ridge-lines formed by a post-glacial lake opposite to Cronk Urleigh that drained via the Ballaleigh valley, westwards into the river of Glen Mooar on the A4 Peel to Kirk Michael road.  The mountain grazing land of Sartfell Park is located on the western side of the nearby Sartfell mountain and Barrowgarrow crossroads.

Bayr Garroo Wesleyan Methodist Chapel
The Barregarrow Methodist Chapel was visited by John Wesley in June 1781 and he wrote in his journal;

Motor-sport heritage
The Barrowgarrow  section of A3 Castletown to Ramsey was part of the 37.50 Mile Four Inch Course  for the RAC Tourist Trophy automobile races held in the Isle of Man between 1908 and 1922.

In 1911 the Four Inch Course for automobiles was first used by the Auto-Cycling Union for the Isle of Man TT motorcycle races.  This included the ‘Barrowgarrow’ section and the course later became known as the 37.73 mile Isle of Man TT Mountain Course which has been used since 1911 for the Isle of Man TT Races and from 1923 for the Manx Grand Prix races.

The C4 Ballaleigh Road with its junction with the A3 Castletown to Ramsey road at the Barregarrow cross-roads has been used as part of a special timed stages for the Rally Isle of Man, the former Manx International Rally and the Manx National Rally events.

Gallery

References 

Barregarrow